Christopher Whelen (17 April 1927 – 18 September 1993) was an English composer, conductor and playwright, best known for his radio and television operas. Because much of his work was written for specific theatre productions in the 1950s, or directly for broadcast in the 1960s to the 1980s, little of it survives today though a number of his scores, etc, have now been deposited in the British Library (MS Mus 1798).

Life
Whelen was born in London and christened at St Martin-in-the-Fields. He was bought up by his mother Winifred, a violinist, with the help of his Godmother Mary Gotch, also a musician. He became a chorister at New College, Oxford, attended Worksop College (studying piano and 'cello) and then at the Birmingham and Midland School of Music (now the Royal Birmingham Conservatoire) between 1944 and 1946 (studying clarinet and composition). 

From an early age Whelen had always wanted to conduct, and after two years National Service in the RAF he secured conducting lessons with the Austrian émigré Rudolf Schwarz., newly appointed to the Bournemouth Municipal Orchestra, subsequently becoming his Assistant Conductor.

Already interested in Celtic culture (particularly Yeats), the music of Arnold Bax held a special appeal and became a central influence for Whelen after hearing a performance of Tintagel.  A correspondence began in 1947, which led to a close friendship until Bax's death in 1953. It was at Bax's request that in 1951 Whelen conducted Bax's Sixth Symphony in Bournemouth. Afterwards Bax wrote: "I still dote on your performance of No 6 and want a repeat".   He was awarded the Elizabeth Sprague Coolidge medal for conducting in 1955.

Given the non-availability of conducting posts at the time and needing to earn a living, Whelen moved to London, whilst continuing for a time to guest conduct in Birmingham, Liverpool, Bournemouth and Dublin.  He subsequently became Director of Music for the Old Vic Theatre company, then engaged in producing a complete cycle of Shakespeare's plays. This rapidly led to his being asked to write incidental music for them, and he found himself launched on a mainly compositional career. Many commissions followed from other theatres but most importantly from the BBC.

He briefly ventured into the field of musicals, culminating in writing the music for John Osborne's The World of Paul Slickey (1959). This was Osborne's only attempt at writing a musical, but after the huge successes of his previous plays Look Back in Anger and The Entertainer, the play was to become "one of the most spectacular disasters in English theatre".

Despite this setback, the theatre work led to a series of commissions for Whelen by the BBC for often experimental television and radio scores spanning the 1960s to the 1980s, including two operas specially conceived for television as well as pioneering hard to classify musico-dramatic works for which he invariably wrote both words and music, fusing the music and action together as an established genre.

Whelen met his lifelong partner Dennis Andrews in 1948 in Bournemouth. They lived together for many years in London and Cumnor, Oxfordshire, before Whelen's death in 1993. The Christopher Whelen Award for innovation in radio, TV and the theatre was set up in his name. Winners include Paddy Cuneen, Jonathan Dove, Orlando Gough and Mick Sands.

Music
Whelen was primarily a music dramatist and his most successful works are the series of radio and television music theatre works commissioned by the BBC starting from the 1960s. His first operatic production, broadcast on 6 August 1961, was The Beggar's Opera, for which he contributed new arrangements of the traditional ballads. The original radio opera The Cancelling Dark, with text by the poet Vernon Scannell, followed on 5 December 1965. Based on a true story, the action alternates between a crashed aircraft in the African jungle near Benguela and the radio control room at Kakonda Airfield. Jeremy Rundall in The Sunday Times said it "has an Ancient Mariner-ish ring, and should be heard again".

In 1966 the BBC announced "our intention to win wider audiences for opera" and a wide-ranging season was programmed by Cedric Messina (Director of Opera - Drama Group).  Most significantly the Press release added "Emphasis will be given to operas specially commissioned for TV".  So John Hopkins and Whelen were jointly commissioned to create a work for BBC2 that would explore what a TV opera might look like.  A subsequent requirement, and one that had seemed unimaginable up till then, was that it must have "a contemporary plot and modern dress".  Overcoming immediate qualms, and encouraged by the BBC's confidence in commissioning not one but two operas from them, Hopkins and Whelen quickly took to the challenge of, in Whelen's words, "the actual creating for television", which "remains the most immediate all-at-once, yet intimate, medium of communication. And surely it is surely today we want to communicate with?"

This, therefore, was how the television opera Some Place of Darkness came into being, and the result was " a sombre domestic drama set in the present, it exemplified all that television promoted".   Some press comments: "(It)managed to combine the immediacy and naturalism of TV and the heightened emotion of musical drama with very great success."(Opera)  "It was pure TV.  This was gripping stuff, much as I disliked it."(The Times)  "(It) will remain in my mind as the first Nouvelle Vague opera."(Musical Opinion)

The second opera Night Cry, although completed and scheduled for production in 1968, was shelved, following a change in the Directorship of BBC2.

By 1969 for Incident at Owl Creek Whelen had dispensed with a librettist, adapting the source material (based on the short story by Ambrose Bierce) himself. A press comment: "It struck me that Whelen had in this new work confirmed "radio opera" as an art form in its own right."(The Sunday Times) Success with this led to him writing a text based on an original idea for The Findings (1972), concerning the excavation of an Etruscan tomb. Creating his own plot and characters presented through his own words and music, Whelen was attempting to create a more personal form of "total musical theatre".  Entered for the Italia Prize in 1972, it elicited the following press comment: "Self knowledge is as suitable a subject for operatic treatment as any other, though this may well be the first opera to discuss bisexuality openly."  Christopher Palmer identified The Findings and Incident at Owl Creek as "outstanding". The music drama The Restorer, produced and directed by Martin Esslin, is an example of Whelen's experimentation with the close combination of words and music. The discovery of a mysterious Dutch painting prompts an intriguing journey of self-exploration. "A haunting experience. There can be few creative artists in the world who could write such an engrossing play as well as compose, orchestrate and conduct its music" Calling Whelen "a trailblazer", Paul Scofield, in a private letter to the composer wrote, "Radio can be so exceptionally exciting, and it certainly is with "The Restorer". The play itself is so rich and mysterious, and explores areas of pain with such delicacy - and at the same time so openly and excitingly dramatic. I can only express my gratitude at being thought of and asked to play, Henry."  

Another strand of Whelen's work was in film. He composed the score for The Valiant (1962), The Face of Fu Manchu (1965) and Coast of Skeletons (1965). There was also a ballet, Cul de Sac, choreographed by Norman Morrice and staged by Ballet Rambert on 13 July 1964 at Sadler's Wells.

Whelen wrote incidental music for over a hundred plays in all, including some twenty-nine for Shakespeare productions at the Old Vic, Stratford-on-Avon and Chichester Festival Theatres - and for BBC radio and television -  as well as major scores, involving both choruses and orchestras for a series of seven Greek Dramas on the BBC's Third Programme.

Works

Television and radio operas
 The Cancelling Dark, radio opera, libretto by Vernon Scannell (1964)
 Some Place of Darkness, television opera, libretto by John Hopkins (1967)
 Incident at Owl Creek, radio opera, libretto Whelen after Ambrose Bierce (1969)
 The Findings, radio opera, libretto Whelen (1972)

Radio drama, words and music by Whelen
 The Restorer (1976)
  Bridges, a play with music written for stereo (1976)
 To the Office and Back, notes towards a portrait of Wallace Stevens (1978)
 Cumulus, a weather fantasy (1980)
 The Jigsaw Must Fit, 'musico-dramatic' work (1983)
 Ed e Subito Sera, a portrait of Salvatore Quasimodo (1984)
 Broad Daylight, a love story in words and music (1986)

Musical comedies
 School (1957) (adapted from T W Robertson). Birmingham Repertory Theatre / Palace Theatre London
 Ferdinand, the Matador (1958) (Book and lyrics by Leo Lehmann). The opening production of the newly built Belgrade Theatre, Coventry
 Who is Hopkin? (1960) Commissioned by R.A.D.A.
 Walker London (1962). Birmingham Repertory Theatre.
 The World of Paul Slickey (1959). (Book and Lyrics by John Osborne - who also directed.) It ran for 3 months at the Palace Theatre, London, and was considered a disaster. The music and the choreography (by Kenneth MacMillan) however were somewhat exempted.

Selected incidental music for theatre, radio and television
 Murder in the Cathedral by T S Eliot (1953, Old Vic Company, recording available)
 The Lord of the Flies by William Golding, dramatised by Archie Campbell (1955)
 The Green Pastures by Marc Connelly (1956), incidental music and musical direction. The spirituals were arranged and conducted by Avril Coleridge-Taylor.
 Arlecchino, by Goldoni (1957) Lyric Hammersmith / Edinburgh
 Pincher Martin by William Golding, dramatised by Archie Campbell (1958)
 Campion (1959 BBC Television mystery series)
 An Age of Kings: Pageant of English History, cycle of Shakespeare history plays (from 1960) (BBC DVD available)
 The Changeling by Thomas Middleton (1960)
 The Lincoln Passion (1963)
 The King Must Die by Mary Renault (1963)
 The Spread of the Eagle, cycle of Shakespeare's 3 Roman plays (1963) BBC TV
 A Christmas Carol by Charles Dickens (1965)
 The Bull From the Sea by Mary Renault (1965)
 The Old Glory, trilogy by Robert Lowell (1969)
 Vivat Rex, a dramatic chronicle of the English crown in 26 episodes, narrated by Richard Burton (1977) (BBC recording available)

Song Cycles 

 A Narrow Bed (Poems by Peter Porter) for Baritone and mixed ensemble (1964). First performed by John Shirley-Quirk (A.T.V./Tempo)
 A Disturbance in Mirrors (Poems by Sylvia Plath) for Soprano and Brass Quintet (1964). First performed by Marjorie Thomas and the Philip Jones Brass Quintet (BBC Radio 3)

Choral (a capella) 

 Pompeii for mixed voices (Words by Peter Porter, based on Pompeian Graffiti).

Orchestral 

 Conversazione. (Dedicated to Rudolf Schwarz) (1964). (Score in Bournemouth Symphony Orchestral Library).
 Cul de Sac, ballet score, first performed by Ballet Rambert at the Sadler's Wells Theatre, 1964, Norman Morrice (choreographer), Ralph Koltai (designer).

Piano 

 Theme and Variations (1946). Written in memory of Whelen's German cousin, killed in the war, the seven variations unusually precede the theme which is then followed by a brief epilogue.
 Piano Sonata (1963). In three movements, first performed by Margaret Gibbs at Wigmore Hall, 10.02.1964.
 Adagio (for left hand) (was written for a personal friend, the Swedish Nobel-Prize winning poet, Tomas Tranströmer.

Writings 
 A.I.Bacharach - Music Masters Vol.4. Chapter on Sir Arnold Bax. (1954). Cassel/Penguin.
 'Thoughts on Television Opera', in Composer 24 (1967), p 17
 The Composer as Dramatist, BBC Radio 3 talk, broadcast 16 July 1972
 Cuchulan Among the Guns: Sir Arnold Bax's Letters to Christopher Whelen, together with the Latter's Writings and Broadcasts on Bax and His Music, edited by Dennis Andrews (2000)

Further reading/listening
 As the Case Requires (a commemorative memorial tribute to Christopher Whelen), Libanus Press, Marlborough, 1994, 110 copies printed
 The Far Theatricals of Day, by Jonathon Dove (Poems by Emily Dickinson) for 4 soloists, choir, brass quintet and organ, commissioned and composed in memory of Christopher Whelen. First performed in Canterbury Cathedral and St Brides Church London, under the auspices of J.A.M. (Peters Edition) (Available on CD)
 Whelen's scores, libretti, privately recorded CDs, etc are held in the British Library (MS Mus 1798).

References

External links
 Christoper Whelen: Music excerpts from The Face of Fu Manchu (1965)
 
 
 

1927 births
1993 deaths
20th-century classical composers
20th-century English composers
20th-century British male musicians